Sunday Driver or Sunday Drivers may refer to:

 Sunday Driver (band), a UK band 
 "Sunday Driver", a song by Her Space Holiday from The Astronauts Are Sleeping
 "Sunday Driver", a song by The Raconteurs 
 "Sunday Driver", a song by Transport
Sunday Drivers (film)  (Sonntagsfahrer), a 1963 East German film
Sunday Drivers (Car Wars) - a 1982 supplement for Car Wars published by Steve Jackson Games